Bryan Miller may refer to:

Bryan Q. Miller, American television and comic writer
Bryan Miller (ice hockey) (born 1983), American ice hockey player
Bryan Miller (athlete) (born 1989), American sprinter
Bryan E. Miller (born 1965), American film composer, pianist, and music producer

See also
Brian Miller (disambiguation)
Miller (surname)